CRGS may stand for:

 Central Region Gliding School, a flight training program for young adults in Canada
 Cleveland Regional Geodetic Survey, a map projection used in Northeast Ohio
 Clitheroe Royal Grammar School, a grammar school in Lancashire, England
 Colchester Royal Grammar School, a grammar school in Essex, England